Michael Jordan Williams (born 6 November 1995) is a Welsh professional footballer who plays for League One club Bolton Wanderers. He can play either central midfield or centre-back.

Club career

Liverpool
Williams joined Liverpool academy at U14 level, having previously been playing for Wrexham.

On 23 September 2014, he made his first-team debut in a League Cup clash against Middlesbrough, coming on as a substitute in 79th minute for Jordan Rossiter. Williams scored in the penalty shootout. He was an unused substitute in the game against AFC Wimbledon in the third round of the FA Cup, and against Blackburn Rovers in a quarter-final of the same tournament, as well as Premier League games against Burnley and Manchester City and a UEFA Europa League clash against Turkish side Beşiktaş J.K. On 22 January 2015, he signed his first professional contract, signing a -year deal with Liverpool.

In 2015 Williams picked up an injury so bad he was nearly forced to retire, however after being the first Welsh footballer to undergo a cartilage transplant he was able to recover and continue his career.

In the 2016–17 season, Williams returned from his injury and was featured for the Liverpool U23 side. He did appear as an unused substitute in a FA Cup fourth round replay against Plymouth Argyle, which saw Liverpool win 1–0. In January transfer window of 2017, Williams was expected to leave the club on a permanent basis, with Charlton Athletic and MK Dons were among interested. Although the move never happened, Williams stayed at the club for the rest of the season; eventually, signing a contract extension.

He was released by Liverpool at the end of the 2017-18 season.

Loan spells
On 26 March 2015, Williams was loaned out to Notts County. He made his Notts County debut, where he started the whole game, in a 2–2 draw against Scunthorpe United on 28 March 2015. He went on to make eight appearances for the side, as Notts County were relegated to League Two next season. He returned to his parent club at the end of the 2014–15 season.

On 10 July 2015, he joined Swindon Town on a season-long loan. Williams made his Swindon Town debut in the opening game of the season, where he set up a goal for Nathan Byrne, who went on to score a hat–trick, in a 4–1 win over Bradford City. He started out in the midfield position before moving to the defence position. However, he suffered a knee injury that saw him sidelined for the most of the season. Although he returned to training in early–2016, Manager Martin Ling hinted about terminating his loan with Swindon Town last month, though he resigned as Manager that month. After cutting his loan spell with the club in February 2016 to allow Williams to heal from his knee injury, he went on to make ten appearances for Swindon Town.

On 31 August 2017, Williams was loaned to Rochdale until 1 January 2018. He made his Rochdale debut, where he started the whole game and played with teammate with the same name, in a 0–0 draw against Southend United on 2 September 2017. In the EFL Trophy Group Stage against Bury, Williams set up a goal for Ian Henderson to score the fourth goal, in a 4–0 win on 19 September 2017. He went on to make 14 appearances for Rochdale before suffering an injury that ended his loan spell at the club.

Rochdale
On 14 June 2018, he joined Rochdale on a permanent deal, signing a two-year contract.

Williams' first game after signing for the club on a permanent basis came in the opening game of the season against Burton Albion, where he started the whole game, in a 2–1 win for Rochdale. A 4–0 loss against Barnsley on 21 August 2018 included three players by the name of Jordan Williams, with two of them at Rochdale and one at Barnsley.

Blackpool
Williams joined Blackpool on 24 August 2020, signing a one-year contract with the option for a further year.

Bolton Wanderers
On 1 February 2021, Williams joined League Two side Bolton Wanderers on an 18-month contract. His debut came on 9 February in a 1–1 draw against Morecambe. Bolton finished the season in third, winning promotion to League One and Williams revealed there was a clause in his contract which would extend it by another year if he made a certain amount of appearances in League One during the 2021–2022 season and 5 November his contract was extended to 2023.

On 9 April 2022, he scored the first league goal of his career when finding the net for Bolton in the 90th minute of a 1–1 draw with Sheffield Wednesday at the University of Bolton Stadium. The only other goal of his career had come in the League Cup for Rochdale away at Newcastle United in January 2020.

International career
Having previously featured for the Wales U17 side, Williams made his Wales under-21 debut in a 1–1 draw against Lithuania on 9 September 2014.

In August 2015, Williams was called up to the Wales senior squad for the first time. He was an unused substitute in the 1–0 win over Cyprus on 3 September 2015.

Personal life
Williams was born in Bangor, North Wales. He is a fluent Welsh speaker, and attended Welsh-medium school Ysgol y Garnedd.

In March 2016, during a Europa League match between Manchester United and Liverpool at Old Trafford, a tweet was sent from Williams' Twitter account which was construed by many as mocking the Munich air disaster. Williams at the time claimed that his Twitter account had been hacked, he apologised and deleted his account. He was later interviewed about the incident and revealed the anguish the incident had caused him and that he had thought "that Tweet could have finished me in football". He explained that he had not intended to reference the Munich air disaster but that it was a reference he and his friends had regularly made about "flying" when doing well. He admitted that his claim that his account had been hacked was borne from a naive panic and was not true.

Career statistics

Notes

Honours
Bolton Wanderers
EFL League Two third-place (promotion): 2020–21

References

External links

 Profile at the Bolton Wanderers F.C. website
 LFC History Profile
 Welsh FA Profile
 

1995 births
Living people
Footballers from Bangor, Gwynedd
Welsh footballers
Wales youth international footballers
Wales under-21 international footballers
Association football midfielders
Liverpool F.C. players
Notts County F.C. players
Swindon Town F.C. players
Rochdale A.F.C. players
Blackpool F.C. players
Bolton Wanderers F.C. players
English Football League players